Zübeyde Süpürgeci (born 20 July 1993) is a Turkish Paralympian athlete competing in the T54 disability class events of 100m, 400m and 800m as well as T53/T54 class  relay event.

Early years
Zübeyde Süpürgeci was born on 20 July 1993. She was disabled from birth. Until the age of 16, she did not even want to go out. She discovered a new world when people around her took her to the 
Disableds' Palace of Bağcılar Municipality. Her younger brother Muhammet was also born disabled.

Sporting career
Süpürgeci started with para athletics in 2011. She began her sporting career through her coach Ömer Cantay. In 2012, she was admitted to the para-athletics team of Bağcılar Belediyesi Disabled SK in Istanbul.

In 2012, she captured the gold medal in the 100m T54 event at the Czech Open - Athletics tournament held in Olomouc. She became bronze medalist in the 100m T54 event at the 2012 IPC Athletics European Championships in Stadskanaal, Netherlands.

Süpürgeci finished the women's wheelchair category of the 2013 Istanbul Marathon at second place in 2:58:30 following her clubmate Hamide Kurt.

She took the bronze medal in the 100m T54 event at the 2014 IPC Athletics European Championships in Swansea, Wales, United Kingdom.

At the 2016 IPC Athletics European Championships in Grosseto, Italy, she won the gold medal in the 100m T54 and the silver medal in the 200m T54 event.

At the 8th FAZAA leg of the IPC Athletics 2016 Grand Prix in Dubai, United Arab Emirates, which was a 2016 Paralympics qualifier, she won the bronze medal in the 200m T54 event and the gold medal in the 400m T54 event. She became bronze medalist in the 100m T54 and silver medalist in the  relay T53/T54 event  of the 2016 IPC Grand Prix.

Süpürgeci competed at the 2016 Paralympics in Rio de Janeiro, Brazil.

She won the gold medal in the 800 m T54 event at the 2018 Mediterranean Games held in Tarragona, Spain.  She became European champion in the 200m T54 event at the  2018 IPC Athletics European Championships in Berlin, Germany breaking the championship record with 30.96. She captured the gold medal in the 100m T54 event of the 2021 World Para Athletics European Championships in Bydgoszcz, Poland, and set a championship record with 16.83. She won further the silver medal in the 400m T54 event in the same championship.

References

1993 births
Living people
Female competitors in athletics with disabilities
Turkish female wheelchair racers
Turkish female sprinters
Turkish female middle-distance runners
Turkish female marathon runners
Paralympic athletes of Turkey
Wheelchair category Paralympic competitors
Athletes (track and field) at the 2016 Summer Paralympics
Athletes (track and field) at the 2018 Mediterranean Games
Mediterranean Games gold medalists for Turkey
Mediterranean Games medalists in athletics
20th-century Turkish sportswomen
21st-century Turkish sportswomen
Islamic Solidarity Games medalists in athletics